MLB The Show 23 is an    upcoming baseball video game by San Diego Studio and published by Sony Interactive Entertainment, based on Major League Baseball (MLB). It will be released for the PlayStation 4 and PlayStation 5, as well as Xbox One, Xbox Series X/S, and Nintendo Switch. The eighteenth entry of the MLB: The Show franchise, it will be released on March 28, 2023. Miami Marlins player Jazz Chisholm Jr. is featured as the cover star, while The Captain Editon of the game will feature retired New York Yankees player Derek Jeter.

For the third consecutive year, the Xbox versions of the game are available for Xbox Game Pass subscribers at no additional cost.

The game will include a new game mode, named Storylines: A New Game Experience. This mode is set to focus on the Negro Leagues. The mode will feature 8 players who played in the Negro Leagues, including Jackie Robinson, Buck O'Neil, Satchel Page, Rube Foster, and more. The mode is a mix of gameplay and narration by Negro Leagues Baseball Museum president Bob Kendrick, highlighting moments from that player's career. For every new launch of MLB The Show, there would be a new season, featuring different players who also played in the Negro Leagues. These players would also become regular players in the other modes of the game.

Other changes included Core Seasons in Diamond Dynasty, which would allow for 99 overall players to be obtained from day one, which take place every 6-8 weeks. For every new Core Season, only the players featured on that and the previous season can be used in Ranked and Conquest. This however, wont affect other gamemodes in Diamond Dynasty such as Play vs CPU. Another new addition is Captain Cards, in which once a certain tier requirement is met for that Captain Card player, it would boost your team significantly. Proper 2-way play was also implemented, so that players, like Shohei Ohtani, could be used as a proper DH if the player so wished, if they also wanted to start him as a pitcher.

References 

Upcoming video games scheduled for 2023
23
Multiplayer and single-player video games
Nintendo Switch games
PlayStation 4 games
PlayStation 5 games
Sony Interactive Entertainment games
Sports video games with career mode
Video games developed in the United States
Video games with cross-platform play
Video games with downloadable content
Xbox One games
Xbox Series X and Series S games
San Diego Studio games